John McWhirter may refer to:

 John MacWhirter (1837–1911), Scottish landscape painter
 John MacWhirter (physician), president of the Royal College of Physicians of Edinburgh, 1831–1833
 John McWhirter (mathematician), British scientist
 John McWhirter, a fictional reporter in the film Full Disclosure

See also 
 John McWhorter (born 1965), American linguist